Muara Dua is a district in Lhokseumawe, Aceh, Indonesia.

Administrative divisions 
list the name of the village (Gampong) is in Districts of Muara Dua

 Gampong Alue Awe (postcode : 24352)
 Gampong Blang Crum (postcode : 24352)
 Gampong Blang Pohroh (postcode : 24352)
 Gampong Cot Girek Kandang (postcode : 24352)
 Gampong Cut Mamplam(postcode : 24352)
 Gampong Keude Cunda (postcode : 24352)
 Gampong Lhok Mon Puteh (postcode : 24352)
 Gampong Meunasah Alue (postcode : 24352)
 Gampong Meunasah Blang (postcode : 24352)
 Gampong Meunasah Manyang (postcode : 24352)
 Gampong Meunasah Mee (postcode : 24352)
 Gampong Meunasah Mesjid (postcode : 24352)
 Gampong Paloh Batee (postcode : 24352)
 Gampong Panggoi (postcode : 24352)
 Gampong Paya Bili (postcode : 24352)
 Gampong Paya Punteut (Punteuet) (postcode : 24352)
 Gampong Uteun Kot (postcode : 24352)

References 

Lhokseumawe
Populated places in Aceh
districts of Lhokseumawe